Aechmea nallyi is a plant species in the genus Aechmea. It is endemic to the Loreto region of Peru but cultivated elsewhere as an ornamental.

Cultivars
 Aechmea 'Olive Smith'

References

nallyi
Flora of Peru
Plants described in 1964